Sunrise: A Song of Two Humans (also known as Sunrise) is a 1927 American silent romantic drama directed by German director F. W. Murnau (in his American film debut) and starring George O'Brien, Janet Gaynor, and Margaret Livingston. The story was adapted by Carl Mayer from the short story "The Excursion to Tilsit", from the 1917 collection with the same title by Hermann Sudermann.

Murnau chose to use the then new Fox Movietone sound-on-film system, making Sunrise one of the first feature films with a synchronized musical score and sound effects soundtrack. The film incorporated Charles Gounod's 1872 composition Funeral March of a Marionette, which was later used as the theme for the television series Alfred Hitchcock Presents (1955–1965). Frédéric Chopin's A minor prelude also features prominently in orchestral arrangement.

Sunrise won the Academy Award for Unique and Artistic Picture at the 1st Academy Awards in 1929. Janet Gaynor won the first Academy Award for Best Actress in a Leading Role for her performance in the film (the award was also for her performances in 1927's 7th Heaven and 1928's Street Angel). The film's legacy has endured, and it is now widely considered a masterpiece and one of the greatest films ever made. Many have called it the greatest film of the silent era. In 1989, Sunrise was one of the 25 films selected by the U.S. Library of Congress for preservation in the National Film Registry for being "culturally, historically, or aesthetically significant". The Academy Film Archive preserved Sunrise in 2004.
The 2007 update of the American Film Institute's list of the 100 greatest American films ranked it number 82, and the British Film Institute's 2012 Sight & Sound critics' poll named it the fifth-best film in the history of motion pictures, while directors named it 22nd.

Although the original 35mm negative of the original American version of Sunrise was destroyed in the 1937 Fox vault fire, a new negative was created from a surviving print.

Plot
A vacationing Woman from the City (Margaret Livingston) lingers in a lakeside town for weeks. After dark, she goes to a farmhouse where the Man (George O'Brien) and the Wife (Janet Gaynor) live with their child. She whistles from the fence outside. The Man is torn, but finally departs, leaving his wife with the memories of better times when they were deeply in love.

The man and woman meet in the moonlight and kiss passionately. She wants him to sell his farm—which has not done well recently—to join her in the city. When she suggests that he solve the problem of his wife by drowning her, he throttles her violently, but even that dissolves in a passionate embrace. The Woman gathers bundles of reeds so that when the boat is overturned, the Man can stay afloat.

The Wife suspects nothing when her husband suggests going on an outing, but when they set off across the lake, she soon grows suspicious. He prepares to throw her overboard, but when she pleads for his mercy, he realizes he cannot do it. He rows frantically for shore, and when the boat reaches land, the Wife flees.

She boards a trolley, and he follows, begging her not to be afraid of him. The trolley brings them to the city. Her fear and disappointment are overwhelming. He plies her with flowers and bread and finally she stops crying and accepts his gifts. Emerging back on the street, they are touched to see a bride enter a church for her processional, and follow her inside to watch the wedding. The Man breaks down and asks her to forgive him. After a tearful reconciliation, they continue their adventure in the city, having their photograph taken together and visiting a funfair. As darkness falls, they board the trolley for home.

Soon they are drifting back across the lake under the moonlight. A sudden storm causes their boat to begin sinking. The Man remembers the two bundles of reeds he placed in the boat earlier and ties the bundles around the Wife. The boat capsizes, and the Man awakes on a rocky shore. He gathers the townspeople to search the lake, but all they find is a broken bundle of reeds floating in the water.

Convinced the Wife has drowned, the grief-stricken Man stumbles home. The Woman from the City goes to his house, assuming their plan has succeeded. The Man begins to choke her. Then the Maid calls to him that his wife is alive, so he releases the Woman and runs to the Wife, who survived by clinging to one last bundle of reeds.

The Man kneels by the Wife's bed as she slowly opens her eyes. The Man and the Wife kiss, while the Woman from the City's carriage rolls down the hill toward the lake, and the film dissolves to the sunrise.

Cast

 George O'Brien as The Man
 Janet Gaynor as The Wife
 Margaret Livingston as The Woman From the City
 Bodil Rosing as The Maid
 J. Farrell MacDonald as The Photographer
 Ralph Sipperly as The Barber
 Jane Winton as The Manicure Girl
 Arthur Housman as The Obtrusive Gentleman
 Eddie Boland as The Obliging Gentleman
 Sally Eilers as Woman in Dance Hall with failing straps (uncredited)
 Gino Corrado as Manager of Hair Salon (uncredited)  
 Herman Bing as Streetcar Conductor (uncredited) 
 Gibson Gowland as Angry Driver (uncredited)

Style

Sunrise was made by F. W. Murnau, a German director who was one of the leading figures in German Expressionism, a style that uses distorted art design for symbolic effect. Murnau was invited by William Fox to make an Expressionist film in Hollywood.

The resulting film features enormous stylized sets that create an exaggerated and fairy-tale world; the city street set alone reportedly cost over US$200,000 to build and was re-used in many subsequent Fox productions, including John Ford's Four Sons (1928). Much of the exterior shooting was done at Lake Arrowhead, California.

Full of cinematic innovations, the groundbreaking cinematography (by Charles Rosher and Karl Struss) features particularly praised tracking shots. Titles appear sparingly, with long sequences of pure action and the bulk of the story told in Murnau's signature style. The extensive use of forced perspective is striking, particularly in a shot of the City with normal-sized people and sets in the foreground and smaller figures in the background by much smaller sets.

The characters go unnamed, lending them a universality conducive to symbolism. Veit Harlan compared his German remake Die Reise nach Tilsit (1939), pointing to the symbolism and soft focus of the original he claimed that Sunrise was a poem, whereas his realistic Die Reise nach Tilsit was a film.

Release
Sunrise premiered on September 23, 1927. It was accompanied by the first ever talking newsreels, which attracted much of the initial interest in the film.

Reception
Mordaunt Hall of The New York Times hailed Sunrise as "A Film Masterpiece". A reviewer for Time, however, called its story "meagre" while writing that the film overall "manages to remain picturesquely soporific for a long evening". Sunrise: A Song of Two Humans is now widely considered by film critics and historians to be one of the greatest films ever made.

Awards and nominations
Academy Award wins (1929)
 Best Unique and Artistic Picture (This Oscar, only awarded at the 1st Academy Awards, was at the time as prestigious as Outstanding Picture, but the Academy has since decided that the higher honor went to Wings in the latter category.)
 Best Actress in a Leading Role – Janet Gaynor (At this time acting awards were given for an actor's entire body of work in a year, so the award was for her work on this film, 7th Heaven, and Street Angel)
 Best Cinematography – Charles Rosher and Karl Struss
Academy Award nominations (1929)
 Best Art Direction – Rochus Gliese

Other distinctions
 1989 – Inclusion into the National Film Registry
 2002, 2012: Ranked in the top 10 of the decennial Sight & Sound critics' poll
 AFI's 100 Years...100 Passions – No. 63
 AFI's 100 Years...100 Heroes and Villains – The Woman from the City (Nominated Villain)
 AFI's 100 Years…100 Movies (10th Anniversary Edition) – No. 82

Home media
20th Century Fox originally released Sunrise on DVD in Region 1, but only as a special limited edition available only by mailing in proofs-of-purchase for other DVD titles in their "20th Century Fox Studio Classics" line, or as part of the box set Studio Classics: The 'Best Picture' Collection. The DVD includes commentary, a copy of the film's trailer, details about Murnau's lost film Four Devils, outtakes, and many more features.

In late 2008, Fox released the "Murnau, Borzage and Fox Box Set" in some markets. Both Movietone and European silent versions of Sunrise are included. A documentary of the three individuals is also part of the collection.

Sunrise has also been released on DVD in the UK as part of the Masters of Cinema series. In September 2009, Masters of Cinema released a 2-disc DVD reissue, containing both the Movietone version and the shorter Czech print found on the 2008 "Murnau, Borzage and Fox" DVD, as well as the extra features found on the previous Masters of Cinema DVD release and the Fox Studio Classics release. The film was released simultaneously on Blu-ray Disc, with both versions of the feature rendered in 1080p High-definition video, and both the stereo and the mono soundtracks rendered in Dolby TrueHD lossless audio. This UK release was the first occasion of a silent film being released on Blu-ray. The Blu-ray disk is apparently not region-encoded, and thus should be viewable on any Blu-ray disk player.

In January 2014, the film was released in the US on a Blu-ray/DVD combo pack by 20th Century Fox.

The film's copyright was renewed, and fell into the public domain on January 1, 2023.

References

External links
 
 
 
 
 
 
 Sunrise: A Song of Two Humans film review by Roger Ebert
 Sunrise: A Song of Two Humans essay at Village Voice

1927 films
1927 romantic drama films
American romantic drama films
American silent feature films
American black-and-white films
Films based on short fiction
Films based on works by Hermann Sudermann
Films set in Germany
Films featuring a Best Actress Academy Award-winning performance
Films whose cinematographer won the Best Cinematography Academy Award
Fox Film films
Films directed by F. W. Murnau
Films produced by William Fox
Films with screenplays by Carl Mayer
Transitional sound films
United States National Film Registry films
Early sound films
Articles containing video clips
1920s American films
Silent romantic drama films
Silent American drama films